Alexandria is the second largest city in Egypt, and the largest city on the Mediterranean coast. During the Hellenistic period, it was home to the Lighthouse of Alexandria, which ranked among the Seven Wonders of the Ancient World, as well as the storied Library of Alexandria. Today, the library is reincarnated in the disc-shaped, ultramodern Bibliotheca Alexandrina. Its 15th-century seafront Qaitbay Citadel is now a museum. Called the "Bride of the Mediterranean" by locals, Alexandria is a popular tourist destination and an important industrial centre due to its natural gas and oil pipelines from Suez.

The city extends about  along the northern coast of Egypt, and is the largest city on the Mediterranean, the second-largest in Egypt (after Cairo), the  fourth-largest city in the Arab world, the ninth-largest city in Africa, and the ninth-largest urban area in Africa.

The city was founded originally in the vicinity of an Egyptian settlement named Rhacotis (that became the Egyptian quarter of the city). It retained this status for almost a millennium, through the period of Roman and Eastern Roman rule until the Muslim conquest of Egypt in 641 AD, when a new capital was founded at Fustat (later absorbed into Cairo).

Alexandria was best known for the Lighthouse of Alexandria (Pharos), one of the Seven Wonders of the Ancient World; its Great Library, the largest in the ancient world; and the Catacombs of Kom El Shoqafa, one of the Seven Wonders of the Middle Ages. Alexandria was the intellectual and cultural centre of the ancient Mediterranean for much of the Hellenistic age and late antiquity. It was at one time the largest city in the ancient world before being eventually overtaken by Rome.

The city was a major centre of early Christianity and was the centre of the Patriarchate of Alexandria, which was one of the major centres of Christianity in the Eastern Roman Empire. In the modern world, the Coptic Orthodox Church and the Greek Orthodox Church of Alexandria both lay claim to this ancient heritage. By 641, the city had already been largely plundered and lost its significance before re-emerging in the modern era. From the late 18th century, Alexandria became a major centre of the international shipping industry and one of the most important trading centres in the world, both because it profited from the easy overland connection between the Mediterranean and Red Seas and the lucrative trade in Egyptian cotton.

History

Ancient era
Recent radiocarbon dating of seashell fragments and lead contamination show human activity at the location during the period of the Old Kingdom (27th–21st centuries BC) and again in the period 1000–800 BC, followed by the absence of activity after that. From ancient sources it is known there existed a trading post at this location during the time of Rameses the Great for trade with Crete, but it had long been lost by the time of Alexander's arrival. A small Egyptian fishing village named Rhakotis (Egyptian: , 'That which is built up') existed since the 13th century BC in the vicinity and eventually grew into the Egyptian quarter of the city. Just east of Alexandria (where Abu Qir Bay is now), there were in ancient times marshland and several islands. As early as the 7th century BC, there existed important port cities of Canopus and Heracleion. The latter was recently rediscovered underwater.

After he captured the Egyptian Satrapy from the Persians, Alexander wanted to build a large Greek city on Egypt's coast that would bear his name. He chose the site of Alexandria, envisioning the building of a causeway to the nearby island of Pharos that would generate two great natural harbours. Alexandria was intended to supersede the older Greek colony of Naucratis as a Hellenistic centre in Egypt, and to be the link between Greece and the rich Nile valley. A few months after the foundation, Alexander left Egypt and never returned to the city during his life.

After Alexander's departure, his viceroy Cleomenes continued the expansion. The architect Dinocrates of Rhodes designed the city, using a Hippodamian grid plan. Following Alexander's death in 323 BC, his general Ptolemy Lagides took possession of Egypt and brought Alexander's body to Egypt with him. Ptolemy at first ruled from the old Egyptian capital of Memphis. In 322/321 BC he had Cleomenes executed. Finally, in 305 BC, Ptolemy declared himself Pharaoh as Ptolemy I Soter ("Savior") and moved his capital to Alexandria.

Inheriting the trade of ruined Tyre and becoming the centre of the new commerce between Europe and the Arabian and Indian East, the city grew in less than a generation to be larger than Carthage. In one century, Alexandria had become the largest city in the world and, for some centuries more, was second only to Rome. It became Egypt's main Greek city, with Greek people from diverse backgrounds.

The Septuagint, a Greek version of the Tanakh, was produced there. The early Ptolemies kept it in order and fostered the development of its museum into the leading Hellenistic centre of learning (Library of Alexandria, which faced destruction during Caesar's siege of Alexandria in 47 BC), but were careful to maintain the distinction of its population's three largest ethnicities: Greek, Egyptian and Jewish.

According to Philo of Alexandria, in the year 38 AD, disturbances erupted between Jews and Greek citizens of Alexandria during a visit paid by King Agrippa I to Alexandria, principally over the respect paid by the Herodian nation to the Roman emperor, and which quickly escalated to open affronts and violence between the two ethnic groups and the desecration of Alexandrian synagogues. This event has been called the Alexandrian pogroms. The violence was quelled after Caligula intervened and had the Roman governor, Flaccus, removed from the city.

In 115 AD, large parts of Alexandria were destroyed during the Kitos War, which gave Hadrian and his architect, Decriannus, an opportunity to rebuild it. In 215 AD, the emperor Caracalla visited the city and, because of some insulting satires that the inhabitants had directed at him, abruptly commanded his troops to put to death all youths capable of bearing arms. On 21 July 365 AD, Alexandria was devastated by a tsunami (365 Crete earthquake), an event annually commemorated years later as a "day of horror".

Islamic era

In 619, Alexandria fell to the Sassanid Persians. The city was mostly uninjured by the conquest and a new palace called Tarawus was erected in the eastern part of the city, later known as Qasr Faris, "fort of the Persians". Although the Byzantine emperor Heraclius recovered it in 629, in 641 the Arabs under the general 'Amr ibn al-'As invaded it during the Muslim conquest of Egypt, after a siege that lasted 14 months. The first Arab governor of Egypt recorded to have visited Alexandria was Utba ibn Abi Sufyan, who strengthened the Arab presence and built a governor's palace in the city in 664–665.

After the Battle of Ridaniya in 1517, the city was conquered by the Ottoman Turks and remained under Ottoman rule until 1798. Alexandria lost much of its former importance to the Egyptian port city of Rosetta during the 9th to 18th centuries, and only regained its former prominence with the construction of the Mahmoudiyah Canal in 1807.

Alexandria figured prominently in the military operations of Napoleon's expedition to Egypt in 1798. French troops stormed the city on 2 July 1798, and it remained in their hands until the arrival of a British expedition in 1801. The British won a considerable victory over the French at the Battle of Alexandria on 21 March 1801, following which they besieged the city, which fell to them on 2 September 1801. Muhammad Ali, the Ottoman governor of Egypt, began rebuilding and redevelopment around 1810, and by 1850, Alexandria had returned to something akin to its former glory. Egypt turned to Europe in their effort to modernize the country. Greeks, followed by other Europeans and others, began moving to the city. In the early 20th century, the city became a home for novelists and poets.

In July 1882, the city came under bombardment from British naval forces and was occupied.

In July 1954, the city was a target of an Israeli bombing campaign that later became known as the Lavon Affair. On 26 October 1954, Alexandria's Mansheya Square was the site of a failed assassination attempt on Gamal Abdel Nasser.

Europeans began leaving Alexandria following the 1956 Suez Crisis that led to an outburst of Arab nationalism. The nationalization of property by Nasser, which reached its highest point in 1961, drove out nearly all the rest.

Ibn Battuta in Alexandria 

In reference to Alexandria, Ibn Battuta speaks of a number of great saints that resided in the city; one such saint was Imam Borhan Oddin El Aaraj, who was said to have the power of working miracles. He told Ibn Battuta that he should go find his three brothers, Farid Oddin, who lived in India, Rokn Oddin Ibn Zakarya, who lived in Sindia, and Borhan Oddin, who lived in China. Battuta then made it his purpose to find these people and give them his compliments. Sheikh Yakut was another notable figure who lived in Alexandria; the disciple of Sheikh Abu Abbas El Mursi, Abu Abbas was the author of the Hizb El Bahr and was famous for piety and miracles. Abu Abd Allah El Murshidi was a great interpreting saint that lived secluded in the Minyat of Ibn Murshed. He lived alone but was visited daily by emirs, viziers, and crowds that wished to eat with him. The Sultan of Egypt (El Malik El Nasir) visited him, as well. Ibn Battuta left Alexandria with the intent of visiting him.

Ibn Battuta also visited the Pharos lighthouse on 2 occasions; in 1326 he found it to be partly in ruins and in 1349 it had deteriorated further, making entrance to the edifice impossible.

Timeline

The most important battles and sieges of Alexandria include:
Siege of Alexandria (47 BC), Julius Caesar's civil war
Battle of Alexandria (30 BC), final war of the Roman Republic
Siege of Alexandria (619), Byzantine-Persian Wars
Siege of Alexandria (641), Rashidun conquest of Byzantine Egypt
Alexandrian Crusade (1365), a crusade led by Peter de Lusignan of Cyprus which resulted in the defeat of the Mamluks and the sack of the city.
Battle of Alexandria (1801), Napoleonic Wars
Siege of Alexandria (1801), Napoleonic Wars
Alexandria expedition (1807), Napoleonic Wars
Bombardment of Alexandria (1882), followed by the British occupation of Egypt

Ancient layout

Greek Alexandria was divided into three regions:
Rhakotis
Rhakotis (from Coptic , "Alexandria") was the old city that was absorbed into Alexandria. It was occupied chiefly by Egyptians.

Brucheum
Brucheum was the Royal or Greek quarter and formed the most magnificent portion of the city. In Roman times, Brucheum was enlarged by the addition of an official quarter, making four regions in all. The city was laid out as a grid of parallel streets, each of which had an attendant subterranean canal.

Jewish quarter
The Jewish quarter was the northeast portion of the city.

This point is very near the present mosque of Nebi Daniel; the line of the great East–West "Canopic" street is also present in modern-day Alexandria, having only slightly diverged from the line of the modern Boulevard de Rosette (now Sharae Fouad). Traces of its pavement and canal have been found near the Rosetta Gate, but remnants of streets and canals were exposed in 1899 by German excavators outside the east fortifications, which lie well within the area of the ancient city.

The end of this abutted on the land at the head of the present Grand Square, where the "Moon Gate" rose. All that now lies between that point and the modern "Ras al-Tin" quarter is built on the silt which gradually widened and obliterated this mole. The Ras al-Tin quarter represents all that is left of the island of Pharos, the site of the actual lighthouse having been weathered away by the sea. On the east of the mole was the Great Harbour, now an open bay; on the west lay the port of Eunostos, with its inner basin Kibotos, now vastly enlarged to form the modern harbour.

In Strabo's time (latter half of the 1st century BC), the principal buildings were as follows, enumerated as they were to be seen from a ship entering the Great Harbour.

The Royal Palaces, filling the northeast angle of the town and occupying the promontory of Lochias, which shut in the Great Harbour on the east. Lochias (the modern Pharillon) has almost entirely disappeared into the sea, together with the palaces, the "Private Port," and the island of Antirrhodus. There has been a land subsidence here, as throughout the northeast coast of Africa.
The Great Theater, on the modern Hospital Hill near the Ramleh station. This was used by Julius Caesar as a fortress, where he withstood a siege from the city mob after he took Egypt after the battle of Pharsalus.
The Poseidon, or Temple of the Sea God, close to the theater
The Timonium built by Marc Antony
The Emporium (Exchange)
The Apostases (Magazines)
The Navalia (Docks), lying west of the Timonium, along the seafront as far as the mole
Behind the Emporium rose the Great Caesareum, by which stood the two great obelisks, which become known as "Cleopatra's Needles," and were transported to New York City and London. This temple became, in time, the Patriarchal Church, though some ancient remains of the temple have been discovered. The actual Caesareum, the parts not eroded by the waves, lies under the houses lining the new seawall.
The Gymnasium and the Palaestra are both inland, near the Boulevard de Rosette in the eastern half of the town; sites unknown.
The Temple of Saturn; site unknown.
The Mausolea of Alexander (Soma) and the Ptolemies in one ring-fence, near the point of intersection of the two main streets.
The Musaeum with its famous Library and theater in the same region; site unknown.
The Serapeum of Alexandria, the most famous of all Alexandrian temples. Strabo tells that this stood in the west of the city; and recent discoveries go far as to place it near "Pompey's Pillar," which was an independent monument erected to commemorate Diocletian's siege of the city.

The names of a few other public buildings on the mainland are known, but there is little information as to their actual position. None, however, are as famous as the building that stood on the eastern point of Pharos island. The first Ptolemy began the project, and the second Ptolemy (Ptolemy II Philadelphus) completed it, at a total cost of 800 talents. It took 12 years to complete and served as a prototype for all later lighthouses in the world. The light was produced by a furnace at the top and the tower was built mostly with solid blocks of limestone. The Pharos lighthouse was destroyed by an earthquake in the 14th century, making it the second longest surviving ancient wonder, after the Great Pyramid of Giza. A temple of Hephaestus also stood on Pharos at the head of the mole.

In the 1st century, the population of Alexandria contained over 180,000 adult male citizens, according to a census dated from 32 AD, in addition to a large number of freedmen, women, children and slaves. Estimates of the total population range from 216,000 to 500,000, making it one of the largest cities ever built before the Industrial Revolution and the largest pre-industrial city that was not an imperial capital.

Geography

Alexandria is located in the country of Egypt, on the southern coast of the Mediterranean. It is in the Far West Nile delta area. Its a densely populated city, its core areas belie its large administrative area.

Notes:2020 CAPMAS projection based on 2017 revised census figures, may differ significantly from 2017 census preliminary tabulations. The 14 kisms were reported simply as Alexandria city by CAPMAS in 2006 but given explosive growth definitions, likely informal, may have change or may be set to change. Same area with 12 kisms existed in 1996. Kisms are considered 'fully urbanized'

Climate
Alexandria has a hot desert climate (Köppen climate classification: BWh), bordering on a hot steppe climate (Köppen climate classification: BSh). Like the rest of Egypt's northern coast, the prevailing north wind, blowing across the Mediterranean, gives the city a less severe climate than the desert hinterland. Rafah and Alexandria are the wettest places in Egypt; the other wettest places are Rosetta, Baltim, Kafr el-Dawwar, and Mersa Matruh.

Alexandria experiences violent storms, rain and sometimes sleet and hail during the cooler months; these events, combined with a poor drainage system, have been responsible for occasional flooding in the city in the past though they rarely occur anymore.
The average annual rainfall is around  but has been as high as 

Port Said, Kosseir, Baltim, Damietta and Alexandria have the least temperature variation in Egypt.

Climate change 
A 2019 paper published in PLOS One estimated that under Representative Concentration Pathway 4.5, a "moderate" scenario of climate change where global warming reaches ~ by 2100, the climate of Alexandria in the year 2050 would most closely resemble the current climate of Gaza City.

Due to its location on a Nile river delta, Alexandria is one of the most vulnerable cities to sea level rise in the entire world. According to some estimates, hundreds of thousands of people in its low-lying areas may already have to be relocated before 2030. The 2022 IPCC Sixth Assessment Report estimates that by 2050, Alexandria and 11 other major African cities (Abidjan, Algiers, Cape Town, Casablanca, Dakar, Dar es Salaam, Durban, Lagos, Lomé, Luanda and Maputo) would collectively sustain cumulative damages of US$65 billion for the "moderate" climate change scenario RCP 4.5 and US$86.5 billion for the high-emission scenario RCP 8.5, while RCP 8.5 combined with the hypothetical impact from marine ice sheet instability at high levels of warming would involve up to US$137.5 billion in damages. Additional accounting for the "low-probability, high-damage events" may increase aggregate risks to US$187 billion for the "moderate" RCP4.5, US$206 billion for RCP8.5 and US$397 billion under the high-end ice sheet instability scenario. In every single estimate, Alexandria alone bears around half of these costs. Since sea level rise would continue for about 10,000 years under every scenario of climate change, future costs of sea level rise would only increase, especially without adaptation measures.

Cityscape

Due to the constant presence of war in Alexandria in ancient times, very little of the ancient city has survived into the present day. Much of the royal and civic quarters sank beneath the harbour and the rest has been built over in modern times.

Pompey's Pillar 

"Pompey's Pillar", a Roman triumphal column, is one of the best-known ancient monuments still standing in Alexandria today. It is located on Alexandria's ancient acropolis—a modest hill located adjacent to the city's Arab cemetery—and was originally part of a temple colonnade. Pompey's Pillar may have been erected using the same methods that were used to erect the ancient obelisks. The Romans had cranes but they were not strong enough to lift something this heavy. Roger Hopkins and Mark Lehrner conducted several obelisk erecting experiments including a successful attempt to erect a 25-ton obelisk in 1999. This followed two experiments to erect smaller obelisks and two failed attempts to erect a 25-ton obelisk. The structure was plundered and demolished in the 4th century when a bishop decreed that Paganism must be eradicated. "Pompey's Pillar" is a misnomer, as it has nothing to do with Pompey, having been erected in 293 for Diocletian, possibly in memory of the rebellion of Domitius Domitianus. Beneath the acropolis itself are the subterranean remains of the Serapeum, where the mysteries of the god Serapis were enacted, and whose carved wall niches are believed to have provided overflow storage space for the ancient Library. In more recent years, many ancient artifacts have been discovered from the surrounding sea, mostly pieces of old pottery.

Catacombs of Kom El Shoqafa 
Alexandria's catacombs, known as Kom El Shoqafa, are a short distance southwest of the pillar, consist of a multi-level labyrinth, reached via a large spiral staircase, and featuring dozens of chambers adorned with sculpted pillars, statues, and other syncretic Romano-Egyptian religious symbols, burial niches, and sarcophagi, as well as a large Roman-style banquet room, where memorial meals were conducted by relatives of the deceased. The catacombs were long forgotten by the citizens until they were discovered by accident in 1900.

Kom El Deka 
The most extensive ancient excavation currently being conducted in Alexandria is known as Kom El Deka. It has revealed the ancient city's well-preserved theater, and the remains of its Roman-era baths.

Temple of Taposiris Magna
The temple was built in the Ptolemy era and dedicated to Osiris, which finished the construction of Alexandria. It is located in Abusir, the western suburb of Alexandria in Borg el Arab city. Only the outer wall and the pylons remain from the temple. There is evidence to prove that sacred animals were worshiped there. Archaeologists found an animal necropolis near the temple. Remains of a Christian church show that the temple was used as a church in later centuries. Also found in the same area are remains of public baths built by the emperor Justinian, a seawall, quays and a bridge. Near the beach side of the area, there are the remains of a tower built by Ptolemy II Philadelphus. The tower was an exact scale replica of the destroyed Alexandrine Pharos Lighthouse.

Citadel of Qaitbay 

Citadel of Qaitbay is a defensive fortress located on the Mediterranean sea coast. It was established in 1477 AD (882 AH) by the mamluk Sultan Al-Ashraf Sayf al-Din Qa'it Bay. The Citadel is located on the eastern side of the northern tip of Pharos Island at the mouth of the Eastern Harbour. It was erected on the exact site of the famous Lighthouse of Alexandria, which was one of the Seven Wonders of the Ancient World. It was built on an area of 17,550 square metres.

Excavation 
Persistent efforts have been made to explore the antiquities of Alexandria. Encouragement and help have been given by the local Archaeological Society, and by many individuals. Excavations were performed in the city by Greeks seeking the tomb of Alexander the Great without success.
The past and present directors of the museum have been enabled from time to time to carry out systematic excavations whenever opportunity is offered; D. G. Hogarth made tentative researches on behalf of the Egypt Exploration Fund and the Society for the Promotion of Hellenic Studies in 1895; and a German expedition worked for two years (1898–1899). But two difficulties face the would-be excavator in Alexandria: lack of space for excavation and the underwater location of some areas of interest.

Since the great and growing modern city stands immediately over the ancient one, it is almost impossible to find any considerable space in which to dig, except at enormous cost. Cleopatra VII's royal quarters were inundated by earthquakes and tsunami, leading to gradual subsidence in the 4th century AD. This underwater section, containing many of the most interesting sections of the Hellenistic city, including the palace quarter, was explored in 1992 and is still being extensively investigated by the French underwater archaeologist Franck Goddio and his team. It raised a noted head of Caesarion. These are being opened up to tourists, to some controversy. The spaces that are most open are the low grounds to northeast and southwest, where it is practically impossible to get below the Roman strata.

The most important results were those achieved by Dr. G. Botti, late director of the museum, in the neighborhood of "Pompey's Pillar", where there is a good deal of open ground. Here, substructures of a large building or group of buildings have been exposed, which are perhaps part of the Serapeum. Nearby, immense catacombs and columbaria have been opened which may have been appendages of the temple. These contain one very remarkable vault with curious painted reliefs, now artificially lit and open to visitors.

The objects found in these researches are in the museum, the most notable being a great basalt bull, probably once an object of cult in the Serapeum. Other catacombs and tombs have been opened in Kom El Shoqafa (Roman) and Ras El Tin (painted).

The German excavation team found remains of a Ptolemaic colonnade and streets in the north-east of the city, but little else. Hogarth explored part of an immense brick structure under the mound of Kom El Deka, which may have been part of the Paneum, the Mausolea, or a Roman fortress.

The making of the new foreshore led to the dredging up of remains of the Patriarchal Church; and the foundations of modern buildings are seldom laid without some objects of antiquity being discovered.

Places of worship

Islam

The most famous mosque in Alexandria is Abu al-Abbas al-Mursi Mosque in Bahary. Other notable mosques in the city include Ali ibn Abi Talib mosque in Somouha, Bilal mosque, al-Gamaa al-Bahari in Mandara, Hatem mosque in Somouha, Hoda el-Islam mosque in Sidi Bishr, al-Mowasah mosque in Hadara, Sharq al-Madina mosque in Miami, al-Shohadaa mosque in Mostafa Kamel, Al Qa'ed Ibrahim Mosque, Yehia mosque in Zizinia, Sidi Gaber mosque in Sidi Gaber, Sidi B esher mosque, Rokay el-Islam mosque in Elessway, Elsadaka Mosque in Sidibesher Qebly, Elshatbi mosque and Sultan mosque.

Alexandria is the base of the Salafi movements in Egypt. Al-Nour Party, which is based in the city and overwhelmingly won most of the Salafi votes in the 2011–12 parliamentary election, supports the president Abdel Fattah el-Sisi.

Christianity
Alexandria was once considered the third-most important see in Christianity, after Rome and Constantinople. Until 430, the Patriarch of Alexandria was second only to the bishop of Rome. The Church of Alexandria had jurisdiction over most of the continent of Africa. After the Council of Chalcedon in AD 451, the Alexandrian Church split between the Miaphysites and the Melkites. The Miaphysites went on to constitute what is known today as the Coptic Orthodox Church. The Melkites went on to constitute what is known today as the Greek Orthodox Church of Alexandria. In the 19th century, Catholic and Protestant missionaries converted some of the adherents of the Orthodox churches to their respective faiths.

Today the Patriarchal seat of the Pope of the Coptic Orthodox Church is Saint Mark Cathedral (though in practice the Patriarch has long resided in Cairo). The most important Coptic Orthodox churches in Alexandria include Pope Cyril I Church in Cleopatra, Saint George's Church in Sporting, Saint Mark & Pope Peter I Church in Sidi Bishr, Saint Mary Church in Assafra, Saint Mary Church in Gianaclis, Saint Mina Church in Fleming, Saint Mina Church in Mandara and Saint Takla Haymanot's Church in Ibrahimeya.

The most important Eastern Orthodox churches in Alexandria are Agioi Anárgyroi Church, Church of the Annunciation, Saint Anthony Church, Archangels Gabriel & Michael Church, Taxiarchon Church, Saint Catherine Church, Cathedral of the Dormition in Mansheya, Church of the Dormition, Prophet Elijah Church, Saint George Church, Saint Joseph Church in Fleming, Saint Joseph of Arimathea Church, Saint Mark & Saint Nektarios Chapel in Ramleh, Saint Nicholas Church, Saint Paraskevi Church, Saint Sava Cathedral in Ramleh, Saint Theodore Chapel and the Russian church of Saint Alexander Nevsky in Alexandria, which serves the Russian speaking community in the city.

The Apostolic Vicariate of Alexandria in Egypt-Heliopolis-Port Said has jurisdiction over all Latin Catholics in Egypt. Member churches include Saint Catherine Church in Mansheya and Church of the Jesuits in Cleopatra. The city is also the nominal see of the Melkite Greek Catholic titular Patriarchate of Alexandria (generally vested in its leading Patriarch of Antioch) and the actual cathedral see of its Patriarchal territory of Egypt, Sudan and South Sudan, which uses the Byzantine Rite, and the nominal see of the Armenian Catholic Eparchy of Alexandria (for all Egypt and Sudan, whose actual cathedral is in Cairo), a suffragan of the Armenian Catholic Patriarch of Cilicia, using the Armenian Rite.
	
The Saint Mark Church in Shatby, founded as part of Collège Saint Marc, is multi-denominational and holds liturgies according to Latin Catholic, Coptic Catholic and Coptic Orthodox rites.

In antiquity Alexandria was a major centre of the cosmopolitan religious movement called Gnosticism (today mainly remembered as a Christian heresy).

Judaism
Alexandria's Jewish community declined rapidly following the 1948 Arab–Israeli War, after which negative reactions towards Zionism among Egyptians led to Jewish residents in the city, and elsewhere in Egypt, being perceived as Zionist collaborators. Most Jewish residents of Egypt moved to the newly settled Israel, France, Brazil and other countries in the 1950s and 1960s.  The community once numbered 50,000 but is now estimated at below 50. The most important synagogue in Alexandria is the Eliyahu Hanavi Synagogue.

Education

Colleges and universities

Alexandria has a number of higher education institutions. Alexandria University is a public university that follows the Egyptian system of higher education. Many of its faculties are internationally renowned, most notably its Faculty of Medicine & Faculty of Engineering. In addition, the Egypt-Japan University of Science and Technology in New Borg El Arab city is a research university set up in collaboration between the Japanese and Egyptian governments in 2010. The Arab Academy for Science, Technology & Maritime Transport is a semi-private educational institution that offers courses for high school, undergraduate level, and postgraduate students. It is considered the most reputable university in Egypt after the AUC American University in Cairo because of its worldwide recognition from board of engineers at UK & ABET in US. Université Senghor is a private French university that focuses on the teaching of humanities, politics and international relations, which mainly recruits students from the African continent. Other institutions of higher education in Alexandria include Alexandria Institute of Technology (AIT) and Pharos University in Alexandria.

Schools

Alexandria has a long history of foreign educational institutions. The first foreign schools date to the early 19th century, when French missionaries began establishing French charitable schools to educate the Egyptians. Today, the most important French schools in Alexandria run by Catholic missionaries include Collège de la Mère de Dieu, Collège Notre Dame de Sion, Collège Saint Marc, Écoles des Soeurs Franciscaines (four different schools), École Girard, École Saint Gabriel, École Saint-Vincent de Paul, École Saint Joseph, École Sainte Catherine, and Institution Sainte Jeanne-Antide. As a reaction to the establishment of French religious institutions, a secular (laic) mission established Lycée el-Horreya, which initially followed a French system of education, but is currently run by the Egyptian government. The only school in Alexandria that completely follows the French educational system is Lycée Français d'Alexandrie (École Champollion). It is usually frequented by the children of French expatriates and diplomats in Alexandria. The Italian school is the Istituto "Don Bosco".

English-language schools in Alexandria are the most popular; those in the city include: Riada American School, Riada Language School, Alexandria Language School, Future Language School, Future International Schools (Future IGCSE, Future American School and Future German school), Alexandria American School, British School of Alexandria, Egyptian American School, Pioneers Language School, Egyptian English Language School, Princesses Girls' School, Sidi Gaber Language School, Zahran Language School, Taymour English School, Sacred Heart Girls' School, Schutz American School, Victoria College, El Manar Language School for Girls (previously called Scottish School for Girls), Kawmeya Language School, El Nasr Boys' School (previously called British Boys' School), and El Nasr Girls' College (previously called English Girls' College).
There are only two German schools in Alexandria which are Deutsche Schule der Borromärinnen (DSB of Saint Charles Borromé) and Neue Deutsche Schule Alexandria, which is run by Frau Sally Hammam.

The Montessori educational system was first introduced in Alexandria in 2009 at Alexandria Montessori.

Women
Around the 1890s, twice the percentage of women in Alexandria knew how to read compared to the same percentage in Cairo. As a result, specialist women's publications like al-Fatāh by Hind Nawal, the country's first women's journal, appeared.

Transport

Airports

From late 2011, El Nouzha Airport (Alexandria International Airport) was to be closed to commercial operations for two years as it underwent expansion, with all airlines operating out of Borg El Arab Airport from then onwards, where a brand new terminal was completed there in February 2010. In 2017, the government announced that Alexandria International Airport will shut down permanently and will no longer reopen.

Port

Alexandria has four ports; namely the Western Port also known as Alexandria Port, which is the main port of the country that handles about 60% of the country's exports and imports, Dekhela Port west of the Western Port, the Eastern Port which is a yachting harbour, and Abu Qir Port at the northern east of the governorate. It is a commercial port for general cargo and phosphates.

Highways
International Coastal Road (Mersa Matruh – Alexandria – Port Said)
Cairo–Alexandria desert road (Alexandria – Cairo – , 6–8 lanes)
Cairo-Alexandria Agriculture Road (Alexandria – Cairo)
Mehwar El Ta'meer – (Alexandria – Borg El Arab)

Rail

Alexandria's intracity commuter rail system extends from Misr Station (Alexandria's primary intercity railway station) to Abu Qir, parallel to the tram line. The commuter line's locomotives operate on diesel, as opposed to the overhead-electric tram.

Alexandria plays host to two intercity railway stations: the aforementioned Misr Station (in the older Manshia district in the western part of the city) and Sidi Gaber railway station (in the district of Sidi Gaber in the centre of the eastern expansion in which most Alexandrines reside), both of which also serve the commuter rail line. Intercity passenger service is operated by Egyptian National Railways.

Trams

An extensive tramway network was built in 1860 and is the oldest in Africa. The network begins at the El Raml district in the west and ends in the Victoria district in the east. Most of the vehicles are blue in colour. Some smaller yellow-coloured vehicles have further routes beyond the two main endpoints. The tram routes have one of four numbers: 1, 2, 5, and 6. All four start at El Raml, but only two (1 and 2) reach Victoria. There are two converging and diverging points. The first starts at Bolkly (Isis) and ends at San Stefano. The other begins at Sporting and ends at Mostafa Kamel. Route 5 starts at San Stefano and takes the inner route to Bolkly. Route 6 starts at Sidi Gaber El Sheikh in the outer route between Sporting and Mustafa Kamel. Route 1 takes the inner route between San Stefano and Bolkly and the outer route between Sporting and Mustafa Kamel. Route 2 takes the route opposite to Route 1 in both these areas. The tram fares used to be 50 piastres (0.50 pounds), and 100 piastres (1.00 pounds) for the middle car, but have been doubled sometime in 2019. Some trams (that date back the 30s) charge a pound. The tram is considered the cheapest method of public transport. A café operates in the second floor of the first car of tram 1 (a women-only car) which costs 5 L.E per person, also offering a WiFi service. A luxury light blue tram car operates from San Stefano to Ras El Tin, with free WiFi and movies and songs played inside for 5 L.E per ticket.

Stations:

nasser (means victory) – (Victoria) (Number 1)
Al Seyouf
Sidi Beshr
El Saraya
Laurent Louran
Tharwat
San Stefano
Gianaklis
Schutz
Safar
Abou Shabana (Baccos)
Al Karnak (Fleming)
Al Wezara (The Ministry)
Isis Bolkly Bulkley
Roushdy
Mohammed Mahfouz
Mustafa Kamil
Sidi Gaber Al-Sheikh
Cleopatra Hammamat (Cleopatra Baths)
Cleopatra El Soghra
El Reyada El Kobra (Sporting El Kobra)
El Reyada El Soghra (Sporting Al Soghra)
Al Ibrahimiyya
El Moaskar (Camp Caesar)
Al Gamaa (The university)
Al Shatby
El Shobban El Moslemin
El Shahid Moustafa Ziean
Hassan Rasim (Azarita)
Gamea' Ibrahim (Mosque of Ibrahim)
Mahattet Al Ramleh (Ramlh Station)

Route 2 serves:

El Nasr – Victoria (Number 2)
Al Seyouf
Sidi Beshr
El Saraya
Louran
Tharwat
San Stefano
Kasr El Safa (Zizini Al Safa Palace)
Al Fonoun Al Gamella (The Fine Arts)
Ramsis (Glym or Gleem)
El Bostan (Saba Basha)
Al Hedaya (The Guidance)
Isis Bolkly
Roushdy
Mohammed Mahfouz
Mustafa Kamil
Sidi Gaber El Mahata (Railway station)
Cleopatra (Zananere)
El Reyada El Kobra (Sporting El Kobra)
El Reyada El Soghra (Sporting Al Soghra)
Al Ibrahimiyya
El Moaskar (Camp Chezar)
Al Gamaa (The university)
Al Shatby
El Shobban El Moslemin
El Shahid Moustafa Ziean
Hassan Rasim (Azarita)
Gamea' Ibrahim (Mosque of Ibrahim)
Mahattet Al Ramlh (Ramlh Station)

Metro
Construction of the Alexandria Metro was due to begin in 2020 at a cost of $1.05 billion.

Taxis and minibuses

Taxis in Alexandria sport a yellow-and-black livery and are widely available. While Egyptian law requires all cabs to carry meters, these generally do not work and fares must be negotiated with the driver on either departure or arrival.

The minibus share taxi system, or mashrū' operates along well-known traffic arteries. The routes can be identified by both their endpoints and the route between them:
Corniche routes:
El Mandara – Bahari
El Mandara – El Mansheya
Asafra – Bahari
Asafra – El Mansheya
El Sa'aa – El Mansheya
Abu Qir routes:
El Mandara – El Mahata (lit. "the Station", i.e. Misr Railway Station)
Abu Qir – El Mahata
Victoria – El Mahata
El Mandara – Victoria
Interior routes:
Cabo – Bahari
El Mansheya – El Awayid
El Mansheya – El Maw'af El Gedid (the New Bus Station)
Hadara – El Mahata

The route is generally written in Arabic on the side of the vehicle, although some drivers change their route without changing the paint. Some drivers also drive only a segment of a route rather than the whole path; such drivers generally stop at a point known as a major hub of the transportation system (for example, Victoria) to allow riders to transfer to another car or to another mode of transport.

Fare is generally L.E. 5.00 to travel the whole route. Shorter trips may have a lower fare, depending on the driver and the length of the trip.

Culture

Libraries

The Royal Library of Alexandria, in Alexandria, Egypt, was once the largest library in the world. It is generally thought to have been founded at the beginning of the 3rd century BC, during the reign of Ptolemy II of Egypt. It was likely created after his father had built what would become the first part of the library complex, the temple of the Muses—the Museion, Greek Μουσείον (from which the Modern English word museum is derived).

It has been reasonably established that the library, or parts of the collection, were destroyed by fire on a number of occasions (library fires were common and replacement of handwritten manuscripts was very difficult, expensive, and time-consuming). To this day the details of the destruction (or destructions) remain a lively source of controversy.

The Bibliotheca Alexandrina was inaugurated in 2002, near the site of the old Library.

Museums

The Alexandria National Museum was inaugurated 31 December 2003. It is located in a restored Italian style palace in Tariq El Horreya Street (formerly Rue Fouad), near the centre of the city. It contains about 1,800 artifacts that narrate the story of Alexandria and Egypt. Most of these pieces came from other Egyptian museums. The museum is housed in the old Al-Saad Bassili Pasha Palace, who was one of the wealthiest wood merchants in Alexandria. Construction on the site was first undertaken in 1926.
Cavafy Museum
The Graeco-Roman Museum – its Director from 2004 to 2010 was archaeologist Mervat Seif el-Din
The Museum of Fine Arts
The Royal Jewelry Museum

Theaters
Alexandria Opera House, where classical music, Arabic music, ballet, and opera are performed and Bearm Basha Theatre in Shatby.

Architecture 
Throughout Alexandria, there is art that resembles some of the oldest architectural styles of the Hellenic city, and its ancient decorations, especially in the Bibliotheca Alexandrina, is based on reviving the ancient Library of Alexandria. The Kom el shoqafa Catacombs are considered one of the Seven Wonders of the Middle Ages and date back to the 2nd century. The remnants of Pompey's Pillar still remain today. This single pillar represents the elaborate temple which once stood in Alexandria. It remains at the site of the Serapeum, Alexandria's acropolis. The Serapeum, which stood for ancient tradition, conflicted with the rise of Christianity. It is a large tourist destination, today. the Roman Amphitheatre of Alexandria is another popular destination. Here, there remains a stage with around seven hundred to eight hundred seats. They also have numerous galleries of statues and details leftover form this time. Alexandria's tourism office announced plans to reserve some beaches for tourists in July 2018.

Sports

The main sport that interests Alexandrians is football, as is the case in the rest of Egypt and Africa. Alexandria Stadium is a multi-purpose stadium in Alexandria, Egypt. It is currently used mostly for football matches, and was used for the 2006 African Cup of Nations. The stadium is the oldest stadium in Egypt, being built in 1929. The stadium holds 20,000 people. Alexandria was one of three cities that participated in hosting the African Cup of Nations in January 2006, which Egypt won. Sea sports such as surfing, jet-skiing and water polo are practiced on a lower scale. The Skateboarding culture in Egypt started in this city. The city is also home to the Alexandria Sporting Club, which is especially known for its basketball team, which traditionally provides the country's national team with key players. The city hosted the AfroBasket, the continent's most prestigious basketball tournament, on four occasions (1970, 1975, 1983, 2003).

Alexandria has four stadiums:

Alexandria Stadium
Borg El Arab Stadium
El Krom Stadium
Harras El Hodoud Stadium

Other less popular sports like tennis and squash are usually played in private social and sports clubs, like:

Alexandria Sporting Club – in "Sporting"
Smouha Sporting Club – in "Smouha"
Al Ittihad Alexandria Club
Olympic Club
Haras El Hodoud SC Club
Koroum Club
Lagoon Resort Courts
Alexandria Country club

Alexandria is also known as the yearly starting point of Cross Egypt Challenge and a huge celebration is conducted the night before the rally starts after all the international participants arrive to the city. Cross Egypt Challenge is an international cross-country motorcycle and scooter rally conducted throughout the most difficult tracks and roads of Egypt.

Twin towns and sister cities

Alexandria is twinned with:

Almaty, Kazakhstan
Baltimore, United States
Bratislava, Slovakia
Catania, Italy
Cleveland, United States
Constanța, Romania
Durban, South Africa
Incheon, South Korea
Kazanlak, Bulgaria
Limassol, Cyprus
Odesa, Ukraine
Paphos, Cyprus
Port Louis, Mauritius
Saint Petersburg, Russia
Shanghai, China
Thessaloniki, Greece

See also

Baucalis
Cultural tourism in Egypt
List of cities and towns in Egypt
List of cities founded by Alexander the Great
Of Alexandria
Alexandria on the Indus
Alexandrian Kings

Notes

References

Further reading
A. Bernand, Alexandrie la Grande (1966)
A. Bernard, E. Bernand, J. Yoyotte, F. Goddio, et al., Alexandria, the submerged royal quarters, Periplus Publishing Ltd., London 1998, 
A. J. Butler, The Arab Conquest of Egypt (2nd. ed., 1978)
 
P.-A. Claudel, Alexandrie. Histoire d'un mythe (2011)
A. De Cosson, Mareotis (1935)
J.-Y. Empereur, Alexandria Rediscovered (1998)
E. M. Forster, Alexandria A History and a Guide (1922) (reprint ed. M. Allott, 2004)
P. M. Fraser, Ptolemaic Alexandria (1972)
Franck Goddio, David Fabre (eds), Egypt's Sunken Treasures, Prestel Vlg München, 2008 (2nd edition), Exhibition Catalogue, 
M. Haag, Alexandria: City of Memory (2004) [20th-century social and literary history]
M. Haag, Vintage Alexandria: Photographs of the City 1860–1960 (2008)
M. Haag, Alexandria Illustrated
R. Ilbert, I. Yannakakis, Alexandrie 1860–1960 (1992)
R. Ilbert, Alexandrie entre deux mondes (1988)
Judith McKenzie et al., The Architecture of Alexandria and Egypt, 300 B.C.–A.D. 700. (Pelican History of Art, Yale University Press, 2007)
Philip Mansel, Levant: Splendour and Catastrophe on the Mediterranean, London, John Murray, 11 November 2010, hardback, 480 pages, New Haven, Yale University Press, 24 May 2011, hardback, 470 pages, 
Don Nardo, A Travel Guide to Ancient Alexandria, Lucent Books. (2003)
D. Robinson, A. Wilson (eds), Alexandria and the North-Western Delta, Oxford 2010, Oxford Centre for Maritime Archaeology, 
V. W. Von Hagen, The Roads that Led to Rome (1967)

External links

Details on the archaïc port with a pdf of Gaston Jondet's report, 1916
Map of Alexandria, ca.1930, Eran Laor Cartographic Collection, The National Library of Israel.
Photos of Alexandria at the American Center of Research

Alexandria
Governorate capitals in Egypt
Ancient Greek archaeological sites in Egypt
Populated places in Alexandria Governorate
Populated coastal places in Egypt
Metropolitan areas of Egypt
Roman towns and cities in Egypt
Mediterranean port cities and towns in Egypt
Populated places along the Silk Road
Cities in Egypt
Cities founded by Alexander the Great
330s BC establishments
330s BC
Populated places established in the 4th century BC
Former capitals of Egypt
Historic Jewish communities in North Africa